A slick is a large chisel, characterized by a wide (2-4 inches, 5–10 cm), heavy blade, and a long, frequently slender, socketed handle. A long, flat metal plate fitted with an offset handle. The combined blade and handle can reach two feet (60 cm) in length. The blade of a slick is slightly curved lengthwise, and/or the handle socket is cranked upward, such that the handle and socket clear the surface of the work when the edge is touching. This distinguishes the slick from the similarly sized, short-handled millwright's chisel.

Use
A slick is always pushed; never struck (thus the slender handle). Using a combination of the tool's weight and bracing the handle against the shoulder or upper arm, fine paring cuts are made. Slicks are typically used by shipwrights and timber framers.

See also

References

External links
Hand Tools & Accessories
Tools Used In Timber-frame Construction

Green woodworking tools
Woodworking chisels
Chisels
Woodworking hand tools